David Edward Stannard (born 1941) is an American historian and Professor of American Studies at the University of Hawaii. He is particularly known for his book American Holocaust (Oxford University Press, 1992), in which he argues that European colonization of the Americas after the arrival of Christopher Columbus resulted in some of the largest series of genocides in history.

Early life 
He was born to Florence E. Harwood Stannard and David L. Stannard, a businessman. He served in the armed forces and worked in the publishing industry between 1959 and 1968. In 1966, he married Valerie M. Nice. The couple, subsequently divorced, had two sons, one of whom died in 2015.

Career 
After returning to college in 1968, Stannard graduated magna cum laude from San Francisco State University in 1971. He then went to Yale and obtained an M.A. degree in history (1972), a Master of Philosophy in American Studies (1973), and a Ph.D. in American Studies in 1975. He has taught at Yale University, Stanford University, the University of Colorado, and the University of Hawaii. He has lectured throughout the United States, in Europe, and in Asia.

He is currently a writer and professor in the Department of American Studies at the University of Hawaii, where he was awarded the Regents' Medal for Excellence in teaching. He has contributed dozens of articles to scholarly journals in a variety of fields.

American Holocaust 

Stannard's research on the indigenous peoples of North and South America (including Hawaii) has produced the conclusion that Native Americans had undergone the "worst human holocaust the world had ever witnessed, roaring across two continents non-stop for four centuries and consuming the lives of countless tens of millions of people." While acknowledging that the majority of the indigenous peoples fell victim to the ravages of European disease, he estimates that almost 100 million died in what he calls the American Holocaust. In response to Stannard's figures, political scientist Rudolph Rummel has estimated that over the centuries of European colonization about 2 million to 15 million American indigenous people were the victims of what he calls democide, which excludes military battles and unintentional deaths in Rummel's definition. "Even if these figures are remotely true," writes Rummel, "then this still make this subjugation of the Americas one of the bloodier, centuries long, democides in world history." According to Guenter Lewy, Stannard's perspective has been joined by noted scholars and activists including Kirkpatrick Sale, Ben Kiernan, Lenore A. Stiffarm, Phil Lane Jr., and Ward Churchill.

Samuel R. Cook of The American Indian Quarterly wrote:

Alfred Crosby of The Boston Sunday Globe wrote:

Francis Jennings of Early American Literature  wrote in his review of the book:

Personal life 
Stannard was the longtime partner of Hawaiian nationalist, University of Hawaii professor emeritus, and author Haunani-Kay Trask.

Works 
Stannard's published books include:
 Death in America (University of Pennsylvania Press, 1975),
 The Puritan Way of Death: A Study in Religion, Culture, and Social Change (Oxford University Press, 1977),
 Shrinking History: On Freud and the Failure of Psychohistory (Oxford University Press, 1980),
 Before the Horror: The Population of Hawaii on the Eve of Western Contact (University of Hawaii Press, 1989),
 American Holocaust: The Conquest of the New World (Oxford University Press, 1992), and
 Honor Killing: How the Infamous "Massie Affair" Transformed Hawaii (Viking Press, 2005).

The Puritan Way of Death was referred to in The New York Review of Books as one of the handful of books—and the only one by an American—that together constituted "the most original and important historical advance of the 1970s."

Shrinking History, published in 1980, was chosen by Psychology Today as one of the 'best books of the year'. His other writings have been translated into German, French, Spanish, Italian, Turkish, and Japanese.

In American Holocaust, he argues that the destruction of the aboriginal peoples of the Americas, in a "string of genocide campaigns" by Europeans and their descendants, was the most massive act of genocide in the history of the world. Although praised by Howard Zinn, Vine Deloria, Dee Brown and others, Stannard's argument generated a great deal of critical commentary. He responded to much of it in a lengthy essay entitled "Uniqueness as Denial: The Politics of Genocide Scholarship", published in Is the Holocaust Unique?, edited by Alan S. Rosenbaum (Westview Press, 1996).

Before the Horror has focused on Hawaii and the Pacific. Having dramatically and upwardly revised the estimated population of Hawaii at the time of Western contact from about 200,000 to between 800,000 and 1,000,000—a change that forced major rethinking about the entirety of Hawaii's history—that work is now being used as the foundation for re-examinations of indigenous population histories throughout the Pacific.

In 2005 Stannard's book Honor Killing used an infamous rape and murder case of the 1930s—one that involved Clarence Darrow arguing his final spectacular defense—to open up a detailed social and political examination of the Hawaiian Islands under US colonial rule. In its review The New York Review of Books described Honor Killing as "finely written and meticulously researched... a biopsy of the racist and imperial arrogance that are an integral, though seldom acknowledged, motif of the history of America."

Awards 
Stannard was the recipient of Guggenheim, Rockefeller, American Council of Learned Societies and other research fellowships and awards.

References

External links 
  Profile.
 

Writers from Hawaii
1941 births
Living people
University of Hawaiʻi faculty
Yale University faculty
Stanford University faculty
University of Colorado faculty
San Francisco State University alumni
Yale University alumni
Historians of genocides